Cristian Maxim (born 26 April 2003) is a Romanian professional footballer who plays as a right midfielder for UTA Arad.

References

External links
 
 

2003 births
People from Mediaș
Living people
Romanian footballers
Romania youth international footballers
Association football midfielders
Liga I players
CS Gaz Metan Mediaș players
FC UTA Arad players